Pandesma muricolor is a moth of the family Erebidae. It is native to western, central & south-eastern Africa.

One known foodplant of this moth is a Fabaceae (Acacia sp.)

References

External links
 africanmoths: Distribution map & picture of Pandesma muricolor

Pandesmini
Moths described in 1966
Lepidoptera of West Africa
Lepidoptera of the Democratic Republic of the Congo
Lepidoptera of Ethiopia
Fauna of Mauritania
Moths of Réunion
Moths of Sub-Saharan Africa